Lasioglossum lanarium is a species of bee endemic to Australia. The species was described by Smith in 1853.

References

External links

lanarium
Insects described in 1853